Opatovské jazierko is a nature reserve in the Slovak municipality of Medveďov in the Dunajská Streda District. The nature reserve covers an area of 2.3 ha of the Danube floodplain area.

Description
The protected area is an important drinking-water reservoir and has landscape-ecological, esthetical and biological significance. With the neighbouring protected areas it creates an valuable complex of floodplain biotopes with a number of rare plants and animals.

References

Geography of Trnava Region
Protected areas of Slovakia